Certified Anesthesia Technician (Cer.A.T.) is a title granted to an individual that successfully meets the experience and examination requirements of the certification. The certification is regulated by the American Society of Anesthesia Technologists & Technicians (ASATT).

Requirements
ASATT requires any candidate seeking certification (Cer.A.T.) meet one of the following requirements:
 ASATT  Certified Anesthesia Technician, Cer.A.T. – No longer offering certification exam.
 Only Certified Anesthesia Technologist Cer.A.T.T exams are offered through ASATT
 Cer.A.T's may advance to Cer.A.T.T through an advanced placement program sponsored by ASATT

References

Anesthesia
Professional titles and certifications